Buam-dong is a dong, neighbourhood of Jongno-gu in Seoul, South Korea.

Attraction
A bronze statue of Choi Gyu-sik (최규식) is on Jaha Gate hill near the Buam-dong residential service office. Choi was a chief of the Jongno police station who killed in the line of duty when North Korean spies tried to penetrate Cheong Wa Dae, South Korean presidential office and residence in 1968.

Another attraction to Buam-dong is the Changuimun Gate, otherwise known as the Northeast Gate of the Fortress Wall of Seoul. Changuimun is one of the Eight Gates of Seoul; its gatehouse is the oldest among the “Four Small Gates” (사소문).

The area is home to a store founded in 1969, Dongyang Bangagan, that sells tteok, traditional rice cakes. It grinds rice to make them at home and sells many varieties, as well as seasonal specialties.

See also
Administrative divisions of South Korea

References

External links
 Jongno-gu Official site in English
 Jongno-gu Official site
 Status quo of Jongno-gu by administrative dong
 Buam-dong Resident office
 Origin of Buam-dong name

Neighbourhoods of Jongno-gu